The Central District of Khatam County is in Yazd province, Iran. At the National Census in 2006, its population was 18,922 in 4,770 households. The following census in 2011 counted 21,210 people in 5,705 households. At the latest census in 2016, the district had 21,408 inhabitants in 6,292 households.

References 

Khatam County

Districts of Yazd Province

Populated places in Yazd Province

Populated places in Khatam County